Baba Tahir or Baba Taher Oryan Hamadani was an 11th-century Persian dervish poet from Hamadan, Iran who lived during the reign of Tugril of the Seljuk dynasty over Iran. This is almost all that is known of him as he lived a mysterious lifestyle. Although prefix "Baba" (roughly meaning 'The Wise' or 'The Respected') has been thought as part of his name in all known sources, his nickname "Oryan" ( meaning 'The Naked' ) did not appear until about 17th-century. The nickname was probably attributed to him because he seemed to lead a very spiritual and stoic lifestyle and thus was figuratively not clothed with worldly and material needs. His poetry is written in the Hamadani dialect of the Persian language. According to L. P. Elwell-Sutton he probably wrote in the Hamadani dialect, adding: "Most traditional sources call it loosely Luri, while the name commonly applied from an early date to verses of this kind, Fahlaviyat, presumably implies that they were thought to be in a language related to the Middle Persian language. Rouben Abrahamian however found a close affinity with the dialect spoken at the present time by the Jews of Hamadan." According to The Cambridge History of Iran, Baba Tahir spoke a certain Persian dialect.

Biography 

Baba Tahir is known as one of the most revered early poets in Persian literature. Little is known of his life. He was born and lived in Hamadan Province in Iran. He was known by the name of Baba Taher-e Oryan (The Naked), which suggests that he may have been a wandering dervish. Legend tells that the poet, an illiterate woodcutter, attended lectures at a religious school, where he was not welcomed by his fellow-students. The dates of his birth and death are unknown. One source indicates that he died in 1019. If this is accurate, it would make Baba Tahir a contemporary of Ferdowsi and Avicenna and an immediate precursor of Omar Khayyam. Another source reports that he lived between 1000 and 1055, which is unlikely. It is said that Baba Tahir lived for seventy-five years. Rahat al-sodur of Ravandi, whose work was completed 603/1206, describes a meeting between Baba Tahir and the Seljuq conqueror Tughril (pp. 98–99). At the time when Baba Tahir lived in the 10th century, there were great changes occurring in the development and growth of literature and art. Medieval artists and poets in Persia were greatly respected and valued and had the right to express their thoughts freely.  According to L. P. Elwell-Sutton: "He could be described as the first great poet of Sufi love in Persian literature. In the last two decades his do-baytis have often been put to music".

Poetry 
Baba Tahir's poems are recited to the present day all over Iran accompanied by the setar, the three stringed viol or lute. This style of poetry is known as Pahlaviat and it is very ancient. The quatrains of Baba Tahir have a more amorous and mystical connotation rather than philosophical.  Many of Baba Tahir's poems are of the do-baytī style, a form of Persian quatrains, which some scholars regard as having affinities with Middle Persian verses.

Writing 
Attributed to him is a work by the name Kalemat-e Qesaar, a collection of nearly 400 aphorisms in Arabic, which has been the subject of commentaries, one allegedly by Ayn-al-Qozat Hamadani. An example of such a saying is one where Baba Tahir ties knowledge with gnosis: "Knowledge is the guide to gnosis, and when gnosis has come the vision of knowledge lapses and there remain only the movements of knowledge to gnosis"; "knowledge is the crown of the gnostic, and gnosis is the crown of knowledge"; "whoever witnesses what is decreed by God remains motionless and powerless."

Tomb
His tomb, designed by Mohsen Foroughi, is located near the northern entrance of the city of Hamadan in Western Iran, in a park, surrounded by flowers and winding paths. The structure consists of twelve external pillars surrounding a central tower. It was constructed in 1970.

See also 

Mir Sayyid Ali Hamadani
Ahmad NikTalab
Persian literature

Notes

References 
 
 
 Browne, E.G. Literary History of Persia, vol. 2 (1906). 
 Jan Rypka, History of Iranian Literature. Reidel Publishing Company. ASIN B-000-6BXVT-K
باباطاهر عریان  , عارف و شاعر بلند آوازه ایران (in Persian)
 
 R. Abrahamian, Dialectologie iranienne : dialectes des Israélites de Hamadan et d’Ispahan et dialecte de Baba Tahir, Paris, 1936.

External links 

 
 
Text of Baba Taher's poems at Ganjoor library (in Persian)

10th-century births
11th-century deaths
11th-century writers
Iranian Sufis
11th-century Iranian people
11th-century Persian-language poets
People from Hamadan